Natasha Sinayobye (born 20 January) is a Ugandan actress, model, singer and dancer. She debuted as a lead actress in the Ugandan film Bala Bala Sese alongside her  boyfriend back then Michael Kasaija. She acted as Kaitesi Munyana in Nana Kagga's TV Series, Beneath The Lies - The Series.

Early life 

Sinayobye was raised in Kampala Uganda and attended school at St. Noah Primary, Balikkudembe Secondary School, Aga Khan High School and then APTECH. She started singing in her early days of primary school taking part in talent shows through to secondary school.

Career 
She rose to fame in 2001 when she emerged second runner up at the Miss Uganda pageant and was crowned Miss MTN Uganda. She later began to explore other projects like modelling with the top most modelling agency in Uganda, Zipper models. In 2011, she was voted No. 1 as the most beautiful women in Uganda by In2EastAfrica. She has appeared as magazine cover girl for African woman, elyt magazine and the beat magazine.
She then ventured into performing arts (dance) joining the Obsessions in the year 2002 where she did various performances and theatrical productions. She finally moved on to found KOMBAT Entertainment Ltd. Under Kombat, she achieved her major performance highlight performing at the opening ceremony for the CHOGM 52 heads of states conference in Uganda 2007. In 2009 together with her boyfriend, they joined drama group The Ebonies.
Come 2010 she began singing professionally and now she has released two hot new singles entitled Butunda and Sikiya, catch them here. Her video Butunda won the most exceptional video in the 2011 Diva Awards.

Personal life 
She has a son named Sean Mario.

Filmography

Film

TV Series

References

External links 
 
 

21st-century Ugandan women singers
Year of birth missing (living people)
Living people
Ugandan film actresses
Ugandan television actresses
21st-century Ugandan actresses